The Jacob Goering House was a historic building located on the hill above downtown Davenport, Iowa, United States. It was listed on the National Register of Historic Places in 1983. The house has subsequently been torn down and the location is now a parking lot for Palmer College of Chiropractic.

History
Jacob Goering was an early labor organizer in Davenport who was involved in more militant national union efforts. He worked at the Chicago, Rock Island and Pacific Railroad shops, and was a leader in the railroad strike of 1877. When placed on the National Register of Historic Places it was one of a few buildings left in Davenport that reflected the city's major social movements of the 19th century.

Architecture
The Goering house exemplified a popular and distinctive house type in 19th century Davenport, a vernacular form of the Greek Revival style. It was a two-story, three bay, brick, front gable house with an oculus in the gable end. The Greek Revival entrance and four-paneled door that was framed by sidelights and a transom was a distinguishing feature of this house from other examples in this style.

References

Greek Revival houses in Iowa
Houses on the National Register of Historic Places in Iowa
Houses in Davenport, Iowa
National Register of Historic Places in Davenport, Iowa